Upu or UPU may refer to:
 Upu or Apu, a historical region surrounding Damascus
 Motusa, a group of villages in Fiji, one of which is Upu
 Unpentunium, a hypothetical chemical element with abbreviation Upu
 Universal Postal Union, a United Nations agency with acronym UPU